Defending champion Thomas Muster defeated Richard Krajicek in the final, 6–2, 6–4, 3–6, 6–3 to win the men's singles tennis title at the 1996 Italian Open.

Seeds

  Thomas Muster (champion)
  Goran Ivanišević (third round)
  Yevgeny Kafelnikov (third round)
  Thomas Enqvist (third round)
  Jim Courier (second round)
  Wayne Ferreira (semifinals)
  Marcelo Ríos (quarterfinals)
  Sergi Bruguera (first round)
  Arnaud Boetsch (first round)
  Marc Rosset (third round)
  Albert Costa (semifinals)
  MaliVai Washington (second round)
  Michael Stich (second round)
  Andriy Medvedev (quarterfinals)
  Todd Martin (third round)
  Cédric Pioline (second round)

Draw

Finals

Top half

Section 1

Section 2

Bottom half

Section 3

Section 4

References
 Official results archive (ATP)
 Official results archive (ITF)

Men's Singles
Singles